The name Clearchus or Clearch may refer to:
Clearchus of Athens, Greek comic poet
Clearchus of Heraclea  (c. 401 BCE – 353 BCE), Greek tyrant of Heraclea Pontica
Clearchus of Rhegium, Greek sculptor, pupil of Eucheirus, teacher of Pythagoras the sculptor (fl. 5th century BCE)
Clearchus of Soli (4th–3rd century BCE), Greek author and philosopher, pupil of Aristotle
Clearchus of Sparta (c. 450 BCE – 401 BCE), Greek general, son of Rhampias
Clearchus (consul 384), Roman consul in 384 CE